Fan*tastik is a Philippine musical variety show aired on TV5 every Sunday. The show premiered on February 27, 2011 and ended on May 22, 2011. The show was broadcast from the Westside Studios at the Broadway Centrum in Quezon City.

Hosts
JC de Vera
Danita Paner
Alex Gonzaga
Kean Cipriano
IC Mendoza

Performers
Arci Muñoz
Diane Medina
Rodjun Cruz
Jasmine Curtis-Smith
Rainier Castillo
Carla Humphries
Edgar Allan Guzman
Lucky Mercado
Jay Durias (Musical Director)
Gerald Santos
Wendy Valdez
Princess Ryan
Yana Asistio
Annyka Asistio
Star Factors Final 12

See also
List of programs aired by TV5 (Philippine TV network)
List of programs broadcast by TV5 (Philippine TV network)

References

Philippine variety television shows
Philippine music television series
2011 Philippine television series debuts
2011 Philippine television series endings
TV5 (Philippine TV network) original programming
Filipino-language television shows